Edayanchavadi, is a developing residential area in North Chennai, a metropolitan city in Tamil Nadu, India

Surroundings

External links
Corporation of Chennai

Neighbourhoods in Chennai